USS Snowdrop has been the name of two ships in the United States Navy.

 , originally named A. DeGroat, was a screw tug built in 1863.
 , was a member of the United States Lighthouse Service until it was incorporated into the Navy in 1917.

United States Navy ship names